Stars in My Crown may refer to:

 Stars in My Crown (film), a 1950 western film starring Joel McCrea 
 Stars in My Crown (album), a 2007 album  by Jorma Kaukonen